Qobong is a community council located in the Mohale's Hoek District of Lesotho. Its population in 2006 was 9,324.

Villages
The community of Qobong includes the villages of:

  Biafa
  Boiketlo
  Boitelo
  Boritsa
  Ha 'Mankieane
  Ha Beila
  Ha Challa
  Ha Koenane (Ha Maama)
  Ha Kori
  Ha Lepeli
  Ha Lephoto
  Ha Mahaha
  Ha Maponyane
  Ha Masia
  Ha Matebesi
  Ha Mavela
  Ha Mokoenehi
  Ha Mokotjane
  Ha Mololi
  Ha Mosaletsane
  Ha Moshaba (Ha Mpholle)
  Ha Motalane
  Ha Motopi
  Ha Motumi
  Ha Mpeki (Taung)
  Ha Nohana
  Ha Ntebele
  Ha Ntinyane
  Ha Ntja
  Ha Ntsokoane
  Ha Nyape
  Ha Pokola
  Ha Rabosiu
  Ha Ramorake
  Ha Ranyali
  Ha Raseboko
  Ha Sebili
  Ha Sebinane
  Ha Seithati
  Ha Sekhohola
  Ha Sele
  Ha Senyane
  Ha Sethobane
  Ha Shokhoa (Makunyapane)
  Ha Tau
  Ha Thaba
  Ha Tlhabeli
  Ha Toko
  Ha Tsuinyane
  Kamor'a-Thaba
  Khakhathane
  Khoating
  Khohlong
  Khorong
  Khorong (Ha Hlooana)
  Khotha
  Khubetsoana
  Khutsong
  Kokobe
  Lefarung
  Lekhalong
  Leqatha
  Leralleng
  Letlapeng
  Lichecheng
  Liefereng
  Lipereng
  Liqaleng
  Litšiloaneng
  Mabeleteng
  Mafika-Lisiu
  Maloreng
  Mamollo
  Mankung
  Masuoaneng
  Mateanong
  Matebeleng
  Materentseng
  Matlapaneng
  Matlopo
  Matsoapong
  Mokeke
  Mokoallong
  Paka-tsa-matsatsa
  Phohlokong
  Poling
  Qobong
  Qomo-Qomo (Mafikeng)
  Ralesollane
  Ralitšibana
  Sekokong
  Seshaing
  Terai Hoek
  Thaba-Lethu
  Thababa-Litlholo
  Thibella
  Thoteng
  Tšepong and Tsoelike.

References

External links
 Google map of community villages

Populated places in Mohale's Hoek District